Henry Nelson O'Neil  (1817, Russia — 1880) was a historical genre painter and minor Victorian writer. He worked primarily with historical and literary subjects, but his best-known paintings dealt with the Indian Mutiny. Eastward, Ho!, dated August 1857 but exhibited the following year, depicts the British troops embarking for India. A second painting, Home Again (1859), shows the troops returning to England. He also had popular successes with romantic scenes portraying the deaths of Mozart and Raphael, depicted as though mentally transported to heaven by their own religious art. In The Last Moments of Mozart the dying composer listens to singers performing part of his Requiem. The Last Moments of Raphael shows the painter contemplating the unseen figure of Christ in his Transfiguration.

O'Neil was a member of The Clique, a group of artists in the 1840s who, like the later Pre-Raphaelite Brotherhood, met regularly to discuss and criticize one another's works. The other members of The Clique were Augustus Egg, Alfred Elmore, Richard Dadd, William Powell Frith, John Phillip, Edward Matthew Ward.

Most of the Clique opposed the Pre-Raphaelites, but O'Neil was the most virulent in his condemnation of the movement, attacking them in both paintings and writings. These included his futuristic fantasy Two Thousand Years Hence (1867), which portrayed Britain in the year 3867 as a frozen wasteland excavated by an archaeologist from New Zealand. The archaeologist uncovers evidence of the decline of British culture in the nineteenth century, allowing O'Neil to vent his own distinctly reactionary political views, predicting dire consequences of the Reform Act 1867.

In July, 1865, O'Neil accompanied the Great Eastern on her voyage to lay the cable of the Atlantic telegraph, hoping to find on board a subject suitable for a picture: the unfortunate breaking of the cable, however, prevented the accomplishment of the artist’s intention. During the voyage he edited and illustrated five issues of the shipboard newsletter The Atlantic Telegraph, and on his return to England he published an account of the expedition in Blackwood’s Edinburgh Magazine. In 1866 he again accompanied the cable expedition, producing five more publications which were printed on board, and later wrote a humorous account of the voyage for the magazine London Society.

Gallery

External links

 
 Discussion of The Parting Cheer, by Henry O'Neil
 O'Neil's Satirical Dialogues at Internet Archive
 Profile on Royal Academy of Arts Collections
 O'Neil's entry in Representative Men in Literature, Science and Art at Google Books
 O'Neil's articles on the 1865 and 1866 Atlantic cable expeditions
 Shipboard publishing on Great Eastern

1817 births
1880 deaths
English people of Russian descent
19th-century English painters
English male painters
British genre painters
19th-century painters of historical subjects
Associates of the Royal Academy
19th-century English male artists